Novoalexandrovka may refer to:
Novoalexandrovka, previous name of Melitopol, Ukraine
Novo-Alexandrovka, previous name of Serebryansk, East Kazakhstan

See also 
Novoalexandrovsk (disambiguation)
Novoalexandrovsky (disambiguation)
Alexandrovka (disambiguation)
Alexandrovsk (disambiguation)